WWA may refer to:

WWA, the ISO 639-3 code of the Waama language, or Yoabu, a Gur language of Benin
WWA, the National Rail station code for Woolwich Arsenal station, London, England
Watch, Warning, and Advisory system of the US National Weather Service 
Wattana Wittaya Academy, a boarding school for girls in Thailand
Western Writers of America, promotes books about the American West
WorldWide Access, a former Internet Service Provider in Chicago, Illinois
World Waterpark Association, for companies who operate water parks 
World Wide Artists, British record label founded in 1973 by Patrick Meehan
World Wrestling All-Stars, a former professional wrestling promotion founded by Andrew McManus
World Wrestling Alliance (disambiguation), various professional wrestling promotions
World Wrestling Association (disambiguation), various professional wrestling promotions
Warsaw
WWA = White + Warm White + Amber. WWA means that this led strip lighting is a white light color, and each LED is a 2in1 CCT LED with two color temperatures, soft white 3000K light and 6000K pure white light are in one SMD LED